An automat is a fast food restaurant where simple foods and drinks are served by vending machines. The world's first automat, Quisisana, opened in Berlin, Germany in 1895.

By country

Germany

The first automat in the world was the Quisisana automat, which opened in 1895 in Berlin, Germany. A similar restaurant existed in Breslau in 1904.

Japan 
In Japan, in addition to regular vending machines which sell prepared food, many restaurants also use food ticket machines, where one purchases a meal ticket from a vending machine, then presents the ticket to a server, who then prepares and serves the meal. Conveyor belt sushi restaurants are also popular.

Netherlands 

Automats provide a variety of typical Dutch fried fast food, such as frikandellen and croquettes, but also hamburgers and sandwiches from vending machines that are back-loaded from a kitchen. FEBO is the best-known chain of Dutch automats. Some outlets are open 24 hours a day, and are popular with locals, and those leaving clubs and bars late at night. The Dutch concept has been successfully exported overseas.

United States 

The first automat in the U.S. was opened June 12, 1902, at 818 Chestnut St. in Philadelphia by Horn & Hardart; Horn & Hardart became the most prominent American automat chain. Inspired by Max Sielaff's AUTOMAT Restaurants in Berlin, they became among the first 47 restaurants, and the first non-Europeans, to receive patented vending machines from Sielaff's Berlin factory. The automat was brought to New York City in 1912, and gradually became part of popular culture in northern industrial cities.

Originally, the machines in U.S. automats took only nickels. In the original format, a cashier sat in a change booth in the center of the restaurant, behind a wide marble counter with five to eight rounded depressions. The diner would insert the required number of coins in a machine and then lift a window, hinged at the top, and remove the meal, usually wrapped in waxed paper. The machines were replenished from the kitchen behind.  All or most New York automats had a cafeteria-style steam table where patrons could slide a tray along rails and choose foods.

The automats were popular with a wide variety of patrons, including Walter Winchell, Irving Berlin and other celebrities of the era. The New York automats were popular with unemployed songwriters and actors. Playwright Neil Simon called automats "the Maxim's of the disenfranchised" in a 1987 article.

The format was threatened by the arrival of fast food, served over the counter and with more payment flexibility than traditional automats. By the 1970s, the automats' remaining appeal in their core urban markets was strictly nostalgic. Another contributing factor to their demise was the inflation of the 1970s, increasing food prices which made the use of coins increasingly inconvenient in a time before bill acceptors commonly appeared on vending equipment. 

At one time, there were 40 Horn & Hardart automats in New York City alone. The last one closed in 1991.  Horn and Hardart converted most of its New York City locations to Burger King. At the time, the quality of the food was described by some customers as on the decline.

2000s US revivals 
In an attempt to bring back automats in New York City, a company called Bamn! opened a new East Village Dutch-style automat store in 2006, but it closed in 2009. In 2015, another attempt was made, by a San Francisco company called Eatsa, which opened six automated restaurants in California, New York and the District of Columbia, but closed them all by 2019. The company rebranded itself as Brightloom, and continues to sell automation technology to restaurants (which includes software for ordering kiosks, mobile apps, digital signage, etc., to facilitate order pickup).

The COVID-19 pandemic has inspired a new wave of automat revival attempts, to adapt to the disease and the desire for contactless dining. Joe Scutellaro and Bob Baydale opened an Automat Kitchen in Jersey City's Newport Centre shopping mall in early 2021, which uses technology similar to what Brightloom offers, and specializes in fresh food. Another is the Brooklyn Dumpling Shop, which is open in the East Village, not far from the Bamn! location.

Rail transport 
A form of the automat was used on some passenger trains. The Great Western Railway in the United Kingdom announced plans in December 1945 to introduce automat buffet cars. Plans were delayed by impending nationalisation, and an automat was finally introduced on the Cambrian Coast Express, in 1962.

In the United States, the Pennsylvania Railroad introduced an automat between Pennsylvania Station, New York City and Union Station, Washington, DC, in 1954. Southern Pacific Railroad introduced automat buffet cars on the Coast Daylight and Sunset Limited in 1962. Amtrak converted four buffet cars to automats in 1985 for use on the Auto Train. The last one in use in the United States was on the short-lived Lake Country Limited in 2001.

In Switzerland, Bodensee–Toggenburg Bahn introduced automat buffet cars, in 1987.

See also 

 Automated restaurant
 Automated retail
 Cafeteria
 Conveyor belt sushi
 FEBO
 Full-line vending
 Virtual restaurant

Further reading
 
 Automatic restaurants, Der Spiegel
  Meet Me at the Automat  By Carolyn Hughes Crowley, Smithsonian
 Before Horn & Hardart: European automats
 The Automat, an east coast oasis
 "The Last Automat," by James T. Farrell (New York (magazine), May 14, 1979)
 Horst Prillinger [https://web.archive.org/web/20150406213710/http://homepage.univie.ac.at/horst.prillinger/blog/aardvark/2009/08/quisisana.html Automatenrestaurant Quisisana, Mariahilfer Straße 34 im 7, Vienna, Austria, 1972]
 from Pohanka, Reinhard; Sinalco-Epoche kenne ich
"The Sinalco Era – Eating, Drinking and Consuming Habits in Post-War Austria"

References

External links 

 In Praise of the Automat – slideshow by Life magazine
 Sielaff Automaten Berlin – Max Sielaff, Automat inventor website
 Used and new Automats in the United States
 Doris Day at the Automat in That Touch of Mink (1962)
 Token from Automatencafe Quisisana, 57 Kärntner street, Vienna, Austria
 Automat Restaurants :: Trade Catalogs and Pamphlets - OCLC
 Automat Restaurants – over 100 years ago – My Stockholm BLOG

Fast-food restaurants
Restaurants by type
Vending

Retail formats

de:Automatenrestaurant